Seilhan is a commune in the Haute-Garonne department in southwestern France.

Name
The name Seilhan is thought to derive from an old Gallo-Roman geographical name (Caelius + anum) but seems to be associated with fountains and ponds, so may derive from another word meaning "bucket."  Some variations on the name include Seilan, Seilhean, Seillan, and Seillant.

The soprano Suzanne Cesbron-Viseur died in Seilhan 23 August 1967.

Population

See also
Communes of the Haute-Garonne department

References

Communes of Haute-Garonne